Wiremu "Wi" Pere (7 March 1837 – 9 December 1915), was a Māori Member of Parliament in New Zealand. He represented Eastern Māori in the House of Representatives from 1884 to 1887, and again from 1893 to 1905. Pere's strong criticism of the government's Māori land policies and his involvement in the turbulent land wars in the 1860s and 1870s made him a revered Māori leader and he was known throughout his career as an contentious debator and outstanding orator in the use of the Māori language.

Biography
Wi Pere was born in 1837 at Tūranga (Gisborne), the son of English Poverty Bay trader Thomas Halbert and esteemed Māori Rīria Mauaranui of Te Whānau-a-Kai hapū of Te Aitanga-a-Māhaki and Rongowhakaata. Pere was baptised William Halbert but commonly went by his Maori name, Wiremu Pere (William Bell).

From a young age Pere was noted for his shrewdness and identified by elders as having exceptional intelligence. He was raised largely under the tutelage of his mother and was schooled in tribal lore and genealogy by Te Aitanga-a-Māhaki iwi elders of the Maraehinahina whare wānanga. This formed the basis of his authority in land dealings and Native Land Court proceedings from the 1870s.

The local Anglican mission also identified Pere as an emerging leader, and he became a member of the first standing committee of the Diocese of Waiapu.

In 1856, Pere married Arapera Matenga Toti at Waerenga-a-hika.

Political career

In 1865, as Pai Marire emissaries gained support in Poverty Bay and tensions grew amid local iwi, Wi Pere remained a government supporter and constant to his Anglican allegiance. However, despite this, he protested against the exile of Poverty Bay Māori to the Chatham Islands, and strongly opposed the government's attempts to confiscate their land. Through his work in the Repudiation movement to support Māori land owners, Pere became an important Māori leader in the region and gained wide support in his first bid for Parliament in 1884.

Pere attracted much attention when he won the Eastern Māori seat in the 1884 general election. As the fourth representative for the electorate, Pere spoke strongly against the Native Land Court's actions of giving land title to individuals, believing land should be owned by hapū (sub-tribes) or whānau (family). He also joined the Kotahitanga movement and supported its efforts to establish a separate Māori Parliament.

In both the 1887 and 1890 elections Pere lost the Eastern Māori seat to James Carroll, who was opposed to the Kotahitanga separatist movement. When Carroll stood down in 1893 to contest the Gisborne (European) seat, Pere won Eastern Maori back as a member of the Liberal Party. He served a further four terms before losing the seat to Āpirana Ngata in the 1905 general election.

Pere was appointed to the Legislative Council on 22 January 1907, where he was effectively the only Māori member. By this time Pere had become a strong empire loyalist. He offered to lead a Māori contingency to the South African war of 1899–1902 and urged military training for all New Zealanders. Pere was unseated from the Legislative Council in 1912.

Death and legacy

Wi Pere died on 9 December 1915, and was buried in a vault at Waerenga-a-Hika on 3 January 1916. In his eulogy Apirana Ngata remarked: "No man ever did more for his people...never was there a greater fighter for his race than Wi Pere".

As a final tribute to Wi Pere, a monument was erected along Reads Quay, Gisborne in 1919 to coincide with the return of Māori troops from war. It was unveiled on 9 April 1919 by Hon. James Carroll.

Māori historian Rongowhakaata Pere Halbert was a grandson of Wi Pere.

External links
Wi Pere Trust
Wiremu Pere Biography from the Dictionary of New Zealand Biography

References

1837 births
1915 deaths
Independent MPs of New Zealand
New Zealand Liberal Party MPs
New Zealand MPs for Māori electorates
Members of the New Zealand House of Representatives
Members of the New Zealand Legislative Council
Māori MLCs
People from Gisborne, New Zealand
Unsuccessful candidates in the 1887 New Zealand general election
Unsuccessful candidates in the 1890 New Zealand general election
Unsuccessful candidates in the 1905 New Zealand general election
19th-century New Zealand politicians
Rongowhakaata people
Te Aitanga-a-Māhaki people
Halbert-Kohere family